Arthur Stanley Gribble  (18 August 1904 - 9 March 2002)  was an Anglican priest in the twentieth century.

Gribble educated at Ulverston Grammar School; Queens' College, Cambridge; and Westcott House, Cambridge. He was ordained deacon in 1930; and priest in 1931. He served curacies in Windermere and Almondbury. He was Chaplain of Sarum Theological College from 1936 to 1938; Rector of Shepton Mallet, 1938–54; Principal of Queen's College, Birmingham from 1954 to 1967 (and a Lecturer at the University of Birmingham); and Canon Residentiary and Chancellor of Peterborough Cathedral from 1967 to 1979.  During his time at Peterborough he was recommended as a potential bishop, but was never appointed one.

References

20th-century English Anglican priests
1899 births
1987 deaths
Alumni of Queens' College, Cambridge
Alumni of Westcott House, Cambridge
People educated at Ulverston Grammar School
Academics of the University of Birmingham
Principals of Queen's College, Birmingham